Pacahuaras is a river in Bolivia.

References

Rivers of Pando Department